The Darwin Region languages are a small family of poorly attested Australian Aboriginal languages of northern Australia proposed by linguist Mark Harvey. It unites the pair of Limilngan languages with two language isolates:

Laragiya (nearly extinct)
Limilngan: 
Limilngan †
Wulna †
Umbugarlic: 
Umbugarla †
Ngurmbur?
Bugurnidja?

Ngurmbur and Bugurnidja are poorly attested extinct languages, which are joined with Umbugarla to form the Umbugarlic branch.

Tryon (2007) lists the following varieties of Umbugarla–Ngumbur:
Ngunbudj (Gonbudj), Umbugarla, Bugunidja, Ngarduk, Ngumbur.
However, nothing is known of Ngunbudj or Ngarduk, which were extinct by WWII.

References 

 
Proposed language families
Non-Pama-Nyungan languages
Extinct languages of the Northern Territory